This was the fourteenth season for the League Cup, which was again known as the John Player Special Trophy for sponsorship purposes.

Hull Kingston Rovers claimed the trophy by beating their local rivals Hull F.C. by the score of 12–0 in the final. The match was played at Boothferry Park, Kingston upon Hull and the attendance was 25,326. Gate receipts were £69555.

Background 
This season saw several changes in the  entrants:
 Cardiff City Blue Dragons were renamed Bridgend Blue Dragons and Kent Invicta were renamed Southend Invicta
 Mansfield Marksman and Sheffield Eagles joined the league and also the competition
 Huyton changed their name to Runcorn Highfield and moved from  Alt Park, Huyton to Canal Street, Runcorn
 and the  re-introduction of the invitation to two junior clubs.
This involved an increase in entrants to thirty-eight, in turn resulting in a six-match, 12-club preliminary round to reduce the number of clubs taking part in the first round proper to thirty-two.

Competition and results

Preliminary round 
Involved six matches and 12 clubs

Round 1 – First round 

Involved  16 matches and 32 clubs

Round 2 – Second  round 

Involved  8 matches and 16 clubs

Round 2 – Second round replays 
Involved one match and two clubs

Round 3 – Quarter-finals 

Involved 4 matches with 8 clubs

Round 4 – Semi-finals 

Involved two matches and four clubs

Final

Teams and scorers 

Scoring - Try = four points - Goal = two points - Drop goal = one point

Prize money 
As part of the sponsorship deal and funds, the  prize money awarded to the competing teams for this season is as follows :-

The road to success 
This tree excludes any preliminary round fixtures

Notes and comments 
 * Myson are a Junior (amateur) club from Hull.
 * Bradford Dudley Hill are a Junior (amateur) club from Bradford.
 * Rothmans Rugby League Yearbook 1990-1991 and 1991-92, and RUGBYLEAGUEproject gives score as 24-10 but Wigan official archives gives it as 24-8
4 * RUGBYLEAGUEproject and Wakefield till I die give the score as 17-6 but Wigan official archives gives it as 17-8
5 * This fixture not shown on Wigan official archives
6 * RUGBYLEAGUEproject give score as 32-5 but Wigan official archives gives it as 32-6
7 * RUGBYLEAGUEproject give score as 4-42 but Wigan official archives  gives it as 4-34
8 * venue possibly Crystal Palace NSC or Chiswick Poly Sports Ground
9 * The highest winning margin to date between professional clubs
10 * RUGBYLEAGUEproject and Hull official archives give score as 26-14 but Wigan official archives gives it as 23-14
11 * Rothmans Rugby League Yearbook 1990-1991 and 1991-92, RUGBYLEAGUEproject and Wigan official archives give the  venue as Boothferry Park but Hull official archives gives it as The Boulevard             Boothferry Park was the home of Hull City A.F.C.
12 * The attendance at this final was a new record, which would never be beaten in the competition
13 * Rothmans Rugby League Yearbook 1990-1991 and 1991-92, RUGBYLEAGUEproject and Wigan official archives give the  venue as Boothferry Park but Hull official archives gives it as The Boulevard             Boothferry Park was the home of Hull City A.F.C.                    
14  * Boothferry Park was the home ground of Hull City from 31 August 1946 until December 2002. The final capacity was 15,160 although the record attendance was 55,019 set on 26 February 1949 in an FA Cup quarter-final when Hull City played host to Manchester United

General information  
The council of the Rugby Football League voted to introduce a new competition, to be similar to The Football Association and Scottish Football Association's "League Cup". It was to be a similar knock-out structure to, and to be secondary to, the Challenge Cup. As this was being formulated, sports sponsorship was becoming more prevalent and as a result John Player and Sons, a division of Imperial Tobacco Company, became sponsors, and the competition never became widely known as the "League Cup".
The competition ran from 1971–72 until 1995–96 and was initially intended for the professional clubs plus the two amateur BARLA National Cup finalists. In later seasons the entries were expanded to take in other amateur and French teams. The competition was dropped due to "fixture congestion" when Rugby League became a summer sport.
The Rugby League season always (until the onset of "Summer Rugby" in 1996) ran from around August-time through to around May-time and this competition always took place early in the season, in the autumn, with the final usually taking place in late January.
The competition was variably known, by its sponsorship name, as the Player's No.6 Trophy (1971–1977), the John Player Trophy (1977–1983), the John Player Special Trophy (1983–1989), and the Regal Trophy in 1989.

See also 
 1984–85 Rugby Football League season
 1984 Lancashire Cup
 1984 Yorkshire Cup
 John Player Special Trophy
 Rugby league county cups

References

External links
 Saints Heritage Society
 1896–97 Northern Rugby Football Union season at wigan.rlfans.com 
 Hull&Proud Fixtures & Results 1896/1897
 Widnes Vikings - One team, one passion Season In Review - 1896-97
 The Northern Union at warringtonwolves.org
 Huddersfield R L Heritage
 Wakefield until I die

1984 in English rugby league
1985 in English rugby league
League Cup (rugby league)